Frank McNulty Beede III  is a former professional American football player who played offensive lineman for five seasons for the Seattle Seahawks, seven years in Arena Football with the San Jose Sabercats, was a history teacher for 15 years and is now an elementary school principal. Married to his wife Kim since 2000, they have 2 children, Frank IV and Kendall, together.

Early life
Beede was born in Antioch, California and graduated from Antioch High School in 1991 where he lettered in three sports: football, wrestling and track.  He was the BVAL heavyweight wrestling champion in his senior year.

College years
Pursuing football in college, Beede played on the offensive line as a guard for three seasons at the University of California at Berkeley. He played in the 1992 Citrus Bowl and 1993 Alamo Bowl and earned honorable mention for the 1994 All-Pacific-10 Conference. Beede was thrown off the team before his senior year for using steroids and transferred to Oklahoma Panhandle State University. There he was named to the NAIA All-America second-team and All-Oklahoma Intercollegiate Conference first-team.

Pro-Football years
Beede joined the Seattle Seahawks in 1996 becoming the first free agent rookie starter in franchise history. He played five years with the Seahawks.

After his years with the Seahawks, Beede joined the Arena Football League as center for the San Jose Sabercats. During his seven years with the Sabercats, he was part of a team that won three ArenaBowl titles in 2002, 2004, and 2007.

Teaching years
Retiring from football in 2007, Beede returned to eastern Contra Costa County as a history teacher and football coach. In 2010, Frank was honored by the NFL as its Teacher of the Year recipient. He stated that he never considered himself a gifted athlete, but that his work ethic and attitude sometimes made him victorious as an NFL player.  He has been teaching at Freedom High School (Oakley, California) since 2008, telling his students that it is not about the skill, but about the will.

In June 2021 it was announced that Beede would become principal at Knightsen Elementary School.

References

External links
 
The Oklahoman's newsroom
Seattle Seahawks

1973 births
American football offensive linemen
Seattle Seahawks players
Sportspeople from the San Francisco Bay Area
California Golden Bears football players
Oklahoma Panhandle State Aggies football players
Living people
Players of American football from California
People from Antioch, California